Boldizsár Bodor (born 27 April 1982 in Pécs) is a Hungarian football (soccer) player, who is currently playing for K.F.C. Antonia. His former clubs include OFI Crete, Roda JC, Beerschot AC and NAC Breda. From 2000 to 2004, he played for K.F.C. Germinal Beerschot, the predecessor of Beerschot AC. He is a solid, versatile player with a good attitude and can play as a left back, left winger or in a defensive midfield role; his main traits are his excellent one-touch passes, accurate cross-field balls and bursts forward when the team are attacking. Bodor is also a freekick specialist and is renowned for a powerful left foot.

Career
After starting his career at Hungarian club Pécsi Mecsek FC in 1999 but left in 2000. Bodor then earned a move to Belgium club K.F.C. Germinal Beerschot in 2001 where he was initially mainly used a substitute, but managed to become a first team regular up until he left the club after the 2003–04 season. He then moved to the Dutch Eredivise in 2004 when he joined Roda JC. In 2004, he played for Roda JC in Europe in the Intertoto Cup competition.

In 2008 Bodor scored a vital goal for Roda JC which was enough to keep them in the Eredivise during a relegation playoff after Roda JC had finished the season third from bottom. He remained a regular at Roda JC playing either as a left back or as a left winger for the club. He stayed at Roda until his contract expired in the summer of 2011 with his final match for Roda coming on 22 May against Ado Den Haag. During the 2010–11 season Bodor played 28 Eredivise games for Roda scoring 2 goals.

On 23 July 2011, he played for Leeds United against Sheffield Wednesday in a pre-season friendly where he came on for the injured Ben Parker. Bodor continued his trial with Leeds and was supposed to attend the club's trip to Norway after impressing Leeds manager Simon Grayson, however the manager decided it would be better for Bodor to play in the local Leeds XI friendly against Bradford Park Avenue. Bodor also played for Leeds in their 3–2 win against Newcastle United at Elland Road, coming on as a second-half substitute. After the match manager Grayson said he would make a decision whether to sign Bodor and fellow trialist Alex Mendy in the next two days after saying he felt both trialists had done ok in their spells. Bodor was released from his trial spell on 4 August after failing to land a contract at Leeds.

On 31 August 2011, he signed a one-year contract with a newly promoted Super League Greece side OFI Crete.

In 2012, he returned to his former club Beerschot AC, signing a one-year contract.

After the bankruptcy of Beerschot, Bodor became a free agent. He signed with Dutch side NAC Breda in July 2013.

International career
After playing for the Hungarian national side through various age groups, In November 2003 Bodor made his debut for the full Hungary National side in a 1–0 loss against Estonia. He has since managed to gain 24 caps for the national side.

Honours
'Roda JC
KNVB Cup: Runner-up 2008

International statistics(Statistics correct )''

References

External links
 Voetbal International profile 

1982 births
Living people
Sportspeople from Pécs
Hungarian footballers
Association football defenders
Hungary international footballers
Hungary youth international footballers
Pécsi MFC players
Beerschot A.C. players
Roda JC Kerkrade players
OFI Crete F.C. players
Belgian Pro League players
Eredivisie players
Super League Greece players
Hungarian expatriate footballers
Expatriate footballers in Belgium
Hungarian expatriate sportspeople in Belgium
Expatriate footballers in the Netherlands
Hungarian expatriate sportspeople in the Netherlands
Expatriate footballers in Greece
Hungarian expatriate sportspeople in Greece